Dioplotherium is an extinct genus of mammal known from Neogene deposits in the southeastern United States.

Taxonomy
"Halianassa" allisoni, described by Kilmer (1965) from remains found in the middle Miocene Isidro Formation of Baja California, Mexico, and known from marine deposits in Baja California and California, has been referred to Dioplotherium by some authors (e.g. Domning 1989, 1996). However, recent cladistic studies find the taxon distantly related to the Dioplotherium type species, and specimens from Brazil attributed to allisoni appear to be a distinct species instead.

References

Miocene sirenians
Fossil taxa described in 1883
Prehistoric placental genera